New Year trees are decorated trees similar to Christmas trees that are displayed to specifically celebrate the New Year. They should not be confused with the practice of leaving up a Christmas tree until after New Year's Day (traditionally until the Epiphany on 6 January).  New Year trees are common in various cultures and nations, chiefly the former Soviet Union, former Yugoslavia, Turkey, China and Vietnam.

Russian and Turkish traditions

Russian and Turkish New Year trees are of the same varieties as those used for Christmas trees, although a spruce tree is the most usual type. The decorations are the same as for Christmas trees; however the Russian style New Year tree is completely secular and its decorations include no religious symbols. While Russian and Turkish North Americans purchasing a tree after Christmas when prices have plummeted might enjoy notable savings, most do not wait beyond Christmas to buy their trees.

History of the Soviet New Year Tree

The tradition of installing and decorating a ёлка (pr: yolka, tr: spruce tree) for Christmas dates back to the 17th century when Peter the Great imported the practice as a result of his travels in Europe. Peter decreed in 1699 that the New Year will be celebrated on 1 January instead of 1 September, and that "Fir tree, pine and juniper branches and trees shall be used to decorate houses and gateways along main streets". However, in Imperial Russia, yolka were banned beginning in 1916 by the Synod as a tradition originating in Germany (Russia's enemy during World War I).

After the revolution of 1917, Christmas celebrations—along with other religious holidays—were discouraged and de facto prohibited as a result of the Soviet antireligious campaign. The League of Militant Atheists encouraged school pupils to campaign against Christmas traditions, among them being the Christmas tree, as well as other Christian holidays, including Easter; the League established an antireligious holiday to be the 31st of each month as a replacement. With the Christmas tree being prohibited in accordance with Soviet anti-religious legislation, people supplanted the former Christmas custom with New Year's trees.

The New Year tree was encouraged in the USSR after the famous letter by Pavel Postyshev, published in Pravda on 28 December 1935, in which he asked for trees to be installed in schools, children's homes, Young Pioneer Palaces, children's clubs, children's theaters and cinemas. In his letter, Postyshev wrote:

In 1937, a Novy God (New Year) Tree was also installed in the Moscow House of the Unions. An invitation to the Yolka at the Palace of Unions became a matter of honour for Soviet children. After the dissolution of the USSR, stigma against religion subsided amidst renewed public interest.

History of the Turkish New Year tree

A Turkish New Year tree, in Turkish "Yılbaşı Ağacı", looks the same as a Christmas tree with Christmas ornaments. It is called a New Year tree because it is specific to the New Year and, with about 95% of Turkey's population Muslim, most Turks do not celebrate Christmas.

After the modernisation of Turkey, the Islamic calendar and the fiscal calendar were replaced by the Gregorian calendar and New Year celebrations started in the late 1920s. The celebrations became popular in Turkey and Christmas trees were brought into the country as New Year trees. Since then, the custom of setting up a tree for the New Year is a traditional event in Turkey. It is usually put up between the beginning of December and the end of January, the mid date being New Year's Eve. Also, the habit of giving presents at Christmas was changed to the giving of New Year presents. The New Year tree can be considered an example of westernised Turkish culture or Turkified European culture.

Also, there is evidence showing that the Turkic tribes celebrated winter solstice with a wish-making tree, a tradition called Nardoqan which could be the ancestor of the modern Christmas tree according to some historians.

Vietnamese and Cantonese custom

Planting a New Year tree or cây nêu is also a Vietnamese custom that is part of the springtime Tết festival. Often a bamboo pole serves as the "tree".

Hoa đào (in Northern) or Hoa mai (in Southern) and kumquat trees are also decorated and displayed in Vietnamese homes during Tết.

In Cantonese, the new year tree is called Nin Fa (literally New Year Flower). Bamboo is just one of the new year trees for the Cantonese, the others being mandarin and peach. The peach flower stands for good relationships; love is one of the relationships, so it's also a wish for love.

See also

 Christmas tree
 Hanukkah bush
 New Year
 Ceremonial pole
 Kadomatsu

References

External links

 New Statesman article on Russian New Years trees
 Symbols of Tết

Trees in culture
Turkish culture
Russian culture
New Year celebrations
Christmas trees
Anti-religious campaign in the Soviet Union